Joshua James Ashby (born 3 May 1996) is an English professional footballer who plays for Oxford City.

Playing career
Ashby graduated out of the Oxford United youth team, signing a three-year professional contract in February 2014. Manager Michael Appleton said that "I've been really impressed with the kid since I walked through the door. From day one my first thought was 'who is that? Tell me about him'". He made his debut for the club on 24 January 2015, playing the full 90 minutes of a 2–2 draw with Exeter City at the Kassam Stadium.

After loan periods at A.F.C. Telford United, Brackley Town and Oxford City, Ashby was released by Oxford United and joined Oxford City on a one-year contract in June 2018. In the 2020–21 season, Ashby scored the winning penalty in City's 2–1 victory over Northampton Town, sending them through to the second round of the FA Cup.

Career statistics

References

External links

1996 births
Living people
English footballers
Association football midfielders
Oxford United F.C. players
Oxford City F.C. players
AFC Telford United players
Brackley Town F.C. players
English Football League players
National League (English football) players